Zohar (lit. Brightness) is a moshav in southern Israel. Located near the city of Kiryat Gat, it falls under the jurisdiction of Lakhish Regional Council.

A large lake that serves as a reservoir lies near the town.

History
The moshav was founded in 1956 by Jewish refugees from Algeria and Tunisia on land, that had belonged to the Arab village of al-Faluja, as part of the effort to settle Hevel Lakhish.

According to Walid Khalidi, Zohar is founded on the land belonging to the  depopulated  Palestinian village of Burayr.

Its name signifies the desire of the inhabitants to be quickly absorbed in what was then a remote frontier region. In later years, new immigrants from Iraq, Russia and Hungary settled there.

In the 1950s and 1960s the moshav was a target for Palestinian fedayeen who infiltrated into Israel from Gaza.

References

Moshavim
Agricultural Union
Populated places established in 1956
Populated places in Southern District (Israel)
1956 establishments in Israel
Algerian-Jewish culture in Israel
Tunisian-Jewish culture in Israel